Claude Estier (born Claude Hasday Ezratty; 8 June 1925 – 10 March 2016)  was a French politician and journalist. He was deputy of Paris from 1967 to 1968 and again from 1981 to 1986, then senator from 1986 to 2004 and was president of the socialist group in the senate from 1988 to 2004.

Biography

Early life
Estier's father was a supporter of the French Section of the Workers' International (SFIO). Because of this, Estier grew up in a socialist culture throughout his youth. His professors included Robert Verdier and Maurice Merleau-Ponty.

Resistance

Estier participated in the Résistance in 1942, engaging in the carriage of arms and newspapers in Lyon until 1944. In charge of reports of listening to Radio Londres and Radio Algiers, the Free France broadcasts, he ended the war in the French Forces of the Interior.

In 1945, he then became a member of the centre-left French Section of the Workers' International (SFIO). A very critical article on the SFIO Interior Minister Jules Moch's harsh repression of the 1947 strikes published in the newspaper Combat at the end of 1947 led to his exclusion from the party.

He campaigned in 1948 for the Unitary Socialist Party where he met, among others, Gilles Martinet and Pierre Stibbe. All three were former Résistance fighters who advocated a left-wing political line between the French Communist Party and the anti-communist SFIO.

Journalist

In 1955 he joined the political redaction of Le Monde, then quit it in 1958 because of the newspaper's attentist attitude towards the return to power of General de Gaulle. He then joined another newspaper, Libération and began a rapprochement with François Mitterrand. He was part of the original core of the weekly Nouvel Observateur.

He was a long-time supporter of the Algerian cause, establishing ties with Algerian nationalists such as Ferhat Abbas.

Political career

National Assembly

He was elected as a candidate for Mitterrand's Convention of Republican Institutions, part of the Federation of the Democratic and Socialist Left electoral coalition, in the legislative election of 1967 against Alexandre Sanguinetti, Minister of Veterans and War Victims in the third Pompidou government under President de Gaulle.  He lost his seat the following year, after the early dissolution of the National Assembly in the aftermath of the May 1968 events.

He was elected again in 1981 and became chairman of the Foreign Affairs Committee of the National Assembly from 1983 to 1986.

He had put a provisional end to his activities as a journalist in 1967, but from 1972 to 1986 he led the official weekly of the Socialist Party, L'Unité. From 1981 to 1988, he regularly took part as such in the animated weekly political debate Vendredi Soir on France Inter with Jean d'Ormesson (a right-wing journalist and writer), Pierre Charpy (his counterpart as head of La Lettre de la Nation, the weekly of the Rally for the Republic) and Roland Leroy (editor-in-chief of the Communist daily L'Humanité).

Senate
In 1986, he entered the Senate in 1988 and became President of the Socialist Group until his retirement in October 2004.

Post-Senator career
After, he returned to literature by publishing two new books in the Cherche-Midi.

Elected offices held
Deputy representing Paris (1967-1968 and 1981-1986)
Paris City councillor (1971-1989 and 1995-2001)
Member of the European Parliament (1979-1981)
Île-de-France regional councilor (1981-1986)
Senator representing Paris (1986-2004)

Notes

References

|-

|-

|-

1925 births
2016 deaths
Politicians from Paris
French Section of the Workers' International politicians
Convention of Republican Institutions politicians
Socialist Party (France) politicians
Deputies of the 3rd National Assembly of the French Fifth Republic
Deputies of the 7th National Assembly of the French Fifth Republic
French Senators of the Fifth Republic
Senators of Paris
MEPs for France 1979–1984
Lycée Carnot alumni
Sciences Po alumni
French Resistance members